Randall John Kramer (born September 20, 1960) is an American former baseball pitcher.

References

Sources

1960 births
Living people
American expatriate baseball players in Canada
Baseball players from California
Buffalo Bisons (minor league) players
Burlington Rangers players
Calgary Cannons players
Chicago Cubs players
Edmonton Trappers players
Gulf Coast Rangers players
Harrisburg Senators players
Kinston Eagles players
Major League Baseball pitchers
Ottawa Lynx players
People from Aptos, California
People from Palo Alto, California
Pittsburgh Pirates players
Richmond Braves players
Salem Redbirds players
San Jose City Jaguars baseball players
Seattle Mariners players
Tri-Cities Triplets players
Tulsa Drillers players
Vancouver Canadians players